The Equestrian Statue of Marcus Aurelius is an ancient Roman equestrian statue on the Capitoline Hill, Rome, Italy. It is made of bronze and stands 4.24 m (13.9 ft) tall. Although the emperor is mounted, it exhibits many similarities to standing statues of Augustus. The original is on display in the Capitoline Museums, with the one now standing in the open air of the Piazza del Campidoglio being a replica made in 1981 when the original was taken down for restoration.

Description
The overall theme is one of power and divine grandeur—the emperor is over life-size and extends his hand in a gesture of adlocutio used by emperors when addressing their troops. Some historians assert that a conquered enemy was originally part of the sculpture (based on accounts from medieval times, including the Mirabilia Urbis Romae, that suggest a small figure of a bound barbarian chieftain once cowered underneath the horse's front right leg). Such an image was meant to portray the Emperor as victorious and all-conquering. However, shown without weapons or armour, Marcus Aurelius seems to be a bringer of peace rather than a military hero, for this is how he saw himself and his reign.He is riding without the use of stirrups, which had not yet been introduced to the West. While the horse has been meticulously studied in order to be recreated for other artists' works, the saddle cloth was copied with the thought that it was part of the standard Roman uniform. The saddle cloth is actually Sarmatian in origin, suggesting that the horse is a Sarmatian horse and that the statue was created to honour the victory over the Sarmatians by Marcus Aurelius, after which he adopted "Sarmaticus" to his name.

History 

The statue was erected around 175 AD. Its original location is debated: the Roman Forum and Piazza Colonna (where the Column of Marcus Aurelius stands) have been proposed. However, it was noted that the site where it had originally stood had been converted into a vineyard during the early Middle Ages.

Although there were many equestrian imperial statues, they rarely survived because it was the common practice to melt down bronze statues for reuse as material for coins or new sculptures in the late empire. Indeed, it is one of only two surviving bronze statues of a pre-Christian Roman emperor; the Regisole, destroyed after the French Revolution, may have been another. The equestrian Statue of Marcus Aurelius in Rome owes its preservation on the Campidoglio to the popular mis-identification of Marcus Aurelius, the philosopher-emperor, with Constantine the Great, the Christian emperor; indeed, more than 20 other bronze equestrian statues of various emperors and generals had been melted down since the end of the Imperial Roman era. It has been speculated that its misidentification stems from the prior existence of an equestrian statue of Constantine which had stood beside the Arch of Septimius Severus, and which had been most likely taken on the orders of the emperor Constans II during his visit to Rome in 663. With its removal, the people eventually mistakenly identified Marcus Aurelius's statue for Constantine's.

In the medieval era it was one of the few Roman statues to remain on public view.  In the 8th century it stood in the Campus Lateranensis, to the east of the Lateran Palace in Rome, sitting on a pedestal that was later provided by Sixtus IV. Its placement next to the Lateran Palace was due the fact that this site used to contain the house of Marcus Aurelius's grandfather Marcus Annius Verus, which was where the Emperor's birth and early education took place. From here it was relocated in 1538, by order of Pope Paul III to remove it from the main traffic of the square. It was moved to the Piazza del Campidoglio (Capitoline Hill) during Michelangelo's redesign of the Hill. Though he disagreed with its central positioning, he designed a special pedestal for it. The original is on display in the Palazzo dei Conservatori of the Musei Capitolini, while a replica has replaced it in the square.

On the night of November 29, 1849, at the inception of the revolutionary Roman Republic, a mass procession set up the Red-White-Green tricolore (now 
Flag of Italy, then a new and highly "subversive" flag) in the hands of the mounted Marcus Aurelius.

In 1979, a bomb attack in the nearby Palazzo Senatorio damaged the statue's marble base.

Cultural significance 

The statue is featured on the reverse of the aureus of Marcus Aurelius, struck in 174 AD.

The statue was formerly clad in gold. An old local myth says that the statue will turn gold again on the Judgement Day.

Influence 
A number of later sculptural works have been influenced by the Equestrian Statue.

Allegedly the equestrian statue of King George III of Great Britain which stood in New York City's Bowling Green until 1776 (when it was thrown down and the lead turned into musket balls for George Washington's army) was based upon the Equestrian Statue of Marcus Aurelius. Richard Westmacott modeled later statues of King George III on the Equestrian Statue.

Sculptor Jacques Saly modeled his 1768 Equestrian statue of Frederick V in Copenhagen, Denmark upon that of Marcus Aurelius.

The Monument to Prince Józef Poniatowski in Warsaw by Bertel Thorvaldsen, from 1829, was based on this statue.

Sculptor David Wynne visited Rome to see the statue, while producing his own equestrian statue, The Messenger.

Replicas

In 1981 work began on producing a replica of the statue for outdoor display. Digital image files were used for reference while a laser beam ensured accurate measurements. Conservators used this copy to cast a faithful bronze replica of the statue, which is currently displayed in the Campidoglio.

In 1908, Brown University erected a bronze replica of the statue. The statue is located on Ruth Simmons Quad, behind Sayles Memorial Hall.

See also
 Regisole

References

External links 

 Capitoline Museum

Sculptures in the Capitoline Museums
Outdoor sculptures in Rome
2nd-century Roman sculptures
Marcus Aurelius
Cultural depictions of Marcus Aurelius
Hellenistic and Roman bronzes
Statues of monarchs
Roman sculpture portraits of emperors
Sculptures of men in Italy